Lomaptera wahnesi  is a species of beetles from the subfamily Cetoniinae, tribe Schizorhinini.

Description
These cetoniids have the tip of the scutellum invisible, which makes the difference with the species of the genus Ischiopsopha.

Distribution
This species is present in Papua New Guinea.

References

External links
 Papua Insects

Cetoniinae
Beetles described in 1906